Saunders-Roe Limited, also known as Saro, was a British aero- and marine-engineering company based at Columbine Works, East Cowes, Isle of Wight.

History

The name was adopted in 1929 after Alliott Verdon Roe (see Avro) and John Lord took a controlling interest in the aircraft and boat-builders S. E. Saunders. Prior to this (excepting for the Sopwith/Saunders Bat Boat) the products were Saunders, the A4 Medina for example dating from 1926. Sam Saunders, the founder, developed the Consuta material used in marine and aviation craft.

The Saunders-Roe interest in aviation didn’t prevent the firm from continuing with the boatbuilding activities associated with S. E. Saunders Ltd.

Saunders Roe concentrated on producing flying-boats, but none were produced in very large quantities – the longest run being 31 Londons. They also produced hulls for the Blackburn Bluebird. During the Second World War, Saro manufactured Supermarine Walrus and Supermarine Sea Otters. Their works at Beaumaris, Anglesey, modified and serviced Catalinas for the Royal Air Force.

In January 1931 Flight magazine revealed that Whitehall Securities Corporation Limited acquired a substantial holding in Saunders Roe. Whitehall Securities was already a large shareholder in Spartan Aircraft Ltd, of Southampton, and arising out of this investment Spartan was effectively merged into Saunders Roe.

In 1938 Saunders-Roe undertook a re-organisation of the commercial and administrative sides of its business. First, the marine section, consisting of the shipyard and boat-building business, was transferred to a new company, Saunders Shipyard Ltd., all of the shares of which were owned by Saunders-Roe Ltd. Mr. C. Inglis was appointed shipyard manager. Secondly, the plywood section of the business carried on at the factory on the River Medina was transferred to a new company, Saro Laminated Wood Products Ltd., in consideration for a majority of the shares therein. Laminated Wood Products Ltd., which had marketed most of the plywood output, also merged its interests into the new company. Major Darwin, managing director, left the company. On the aircraft side of the business Mr. Broadsmith continued as director and general manager. All other senior posts in the executive staff remain unchanged.

In 1947 they flew the SR.A/1 fighter prototype, one of the world's first jet-powered flying boats, and in 1952 they flew the prototype Princess airliner, but the age of the flying-boat was over and the two further Princess examples to be completed were never flown. No further new seaplanes were produced here. Modification work on Short-built flying boats continued at Cowes until 1955. 

The last fixed-wing aircraft they built was experimental SR53 mixed-power interceptor.

In 1951 Saunders-Roe took over the interests of the Cierva Autogiro Company at Eastleigh including the Skeeter helicopter project. 
In September 1952 the company comprised:
 Saunders-Roe Ltd. with a Head Office in Osborne, East Cowes, Isle of Wight (I.O.W.) with works at Columbine I.O.W. and Southampton Airport.
There was a branch design office in London, during the 1950s. It was situated in Queens Square, overlooking the Great Ormond Street Hospital for Children
 Saunders-Roe (Anglesey) Ltd, Friars Works, Beaumaris, North Wales
 Saro Laminated Wood Products Ltd., Folly Works, Whippingham, I.O.W.
 Princess Air Transport Co. Ltd of Osborne I.O.W. with an office in London at 45 Parliament St. SW1.

In 1959 it demonstrated the first practical hovercraft built under contract to the National Research Development Corporation to Christopher Cockerell's design, the SR.N1.

In the same year Saro's helicopter and hovercraft interests were taken over by Westland Aircraft which continued the Skeeter family with the Scout and Wasp. In 1964 all the hovercraft businesses under Westland were merged with Vickers-Armstrongs to form the British Hovercraft Corporation. This, in turn, was taken over by Westland and was renamed Westland Aerospace in 1985, and hovercraft production was reduced to nearly nothing until the advent of the AP1-88. The company produced sub contract work for Britten-Norman, produced composites and component parts for the aircraft industry, especially engine nacelles for many aircraft including the De Havilland Canada "Dash 8", the Lockheed Hercules, the British Aerospace Jetstream and parts for the McDonnell-Douglas MD-11. By the mid-1990s, over 60% of the world's production of turboprop nacelles took place in the East Cowes works.

In the late 1960s/early 1970s the Saunders-Roe Folly Works, by then owned by Hawker Siddeley was merged with the Gloster works to form Gloster-Saro utilising both companies' expertise in aluminium forming to produce fire appliances and tankers in the Gloster factory at Hucclecote, mostly based on Reynolds-Boughton chassis. In 1984 Gloster Saro acquired the fire tender business of the Chubb group with the company merging in 1987 with Simon Engineering to form Simon Gloster Saro.

In 1994 Westland was taken over by GKN, and when GKN sold off its shares of Westland to form Agusta-Westland, it retained the East Cowes works, where it continues aircraft component design and production.

Laird (Anglesey) Ltd was formed in 1968 and incorporated the Beaumaris and Llangefni factories of Saunders-Roe and the engineering business of Birkenhead shipbuilders Cammell Laird. Laird developed the Centaur, which was half Land Rover and half light tank. The company is now known as FAUN Municipal Vehicles Ltd.having been taken over yet again. Today, FAUN manufactures portable aluminium roadways and runways at Llangefni under its TRACKWAY brand.

In 2015, the East Cowes Columbine Hangar (famously now with the huge Union Jack painted on its doors) was leased from Homes & Communities Agency to Shemara Refit (now Wight Shipyard Co. Ltd), initially to carry out a total refit of MY Shemara, and who have constructed the catamaran ferry Red Jet 6 inside the hangar for use by Red Funnel Ferries, with the next Red Jet in the series, Red Jet 7, also built there. The GKN North site had sold in 2002 for £8m to a government quango, SEEDA, South East Enterprise Development Agency for the regeneration of East Cowes. That stalled with the financial crash in 2008 and is set never to achieve the sites full potential as a deep water Prime Tier 1 Marine Industrial Site.

The docks at the Columbine Hangar have also been used by Red Funnel as berths for their Red Jet catamaran ferries when not in use; for example, Red Jet 6 was berthed at the Columbine while undergoing system tests, while Red Jet 3 was docked there while on sale awaiting a buyer during 2018.

Saunders and Saunders-Roe designs

Boatbuilding
Lifeboats for the Royal National Lifeboat Institution (RNLI) including the  Liverpool-class Motor Lifeboats and 51ft Barnett-class. 
Powerboats including the record breaking Miss England II in 1930 for Lord Wakefield and Blue Bird K3 in 1937 for Sir Malcolm Campbell.
Dark class fast patrol boats built for the United Kingdom's Royal Navy, the Myanmar Navy,  Finnish Navy and the Japan_Maritime_Self-Defense_Force

Flying boats
Saunders Kittiwake
Saunders A.3 Valkyrie
Saunders A.4 Medina
Saunders A.14
Saunders/Saro A.7 Severn
Saro A.17 Cutty Sark
Saro A.19 Cloud
Saro A.21 Windhover
Saro A.27 London
Saro A.29 Cloud Monospar
Saro A.33
Saro A.36 Lerwick
Saro A.37 Shrimp
Saunders-Roe SR.A/1
Saunders-Roe SR.45 Princess
Saunders-Roe Jet Princess (paper project only)
Saunders-Roe Duchess (paper project only)
Saunders-Roe Queen  – concept only for a 24 jet engine, 313 ft wingspan flying boat for P&O with accommodation for 1,000 passengers.

Land-based aircraft
Saunders T.1
A.22 Segrave Meteor – Designed by Sir Henry Segrave
Saunders/Saro A.10 "Multigun" – 1928
Saro-Percival Mailplane also known as A.24 Mailplane – designed by Edgar Percival, – 1931
A.24M (Spartan Cruiser) – derived from Saro Mailplane. Built by Spartan Aircraft Limited – 1932
Saunders-Roe SR.53 – mixed power interceptor
Saunders-Roe SR.177 – mixed power interceptor (cancelled before completion)

Helicopters
Cierva Air Horse , taken over from Cierva company
Saunders Helicogyre
Saunders-Roe Skeeter
Saro P.531 – development of Skeeter, led to Westland Scout and Wasp
Hiller ROE Rotorcycle

Hovercraft
SR.N1 ("Saunders Roe Nautical 1"): First modern hovercraft
SR.N2 First to operate a commercial service
SR.N3 First designed for military use
SR.N4 or Mountbatten class – large 4 prop ferry
SR.N5 Also Bell SK-5, as PACV used in Vietnam
SR.N6 Longer SR.N5 38 passengers

Spacecraft
With the Royal Aircraft Establishment
Black Knight
Black Arrow
Black Prince
The Rocket Development Division was formed in 1956 and the Rocket Test site at Highdown started functioning exactly one year later. The division was headquartered at Yeovil. It was this Division, in conjunction with the Royal Aircraft Establishment, that was responsible for the design, manufacture and static testing of the Black Knight Rocket, the first of which was successfully fired at Woomera, South Australia, on 7 September 1958.

Military canoes, assault boats and load carriers (World War II)
Designed by Fred Goatley# Marine designer
Mark 2 Canoe – 1941–1942 (used on the Cockleshell Heroes "Frankton Raid")
Mk 2** Canoe – 1943 ( used in Leros – various, incl. Sunbeam Raids )
12-man Assault craft c. 1940–1942
8 ton load carrier. c. 1942–1943

Electronics
The Electronics Division was formed in 1948. Its progress was rapid and the Division also designed and manufactured such diverse specialist equipment as Analogue Computers, Control Simulators and a variety of Electronic Equipment and Electronic Test sets associated with Guided Weapons.  When using strain gauges of the normal wire type in the dynamic testing of helicopter components, notably rotor blades, Saunders-Roe found that such a high proportion of the gauges were failing that development was considerably retarded. The Electronics Division was therefore asked to devise an improved gauge and, in collaboration with Messrs. Technograph Printed Circuits Ltd., produced the foil strain gauge.

Hydrofoil 
 R-103 – a 17-ton hydrofoil for Royal Canadian Navy, known as "Bras d'Or". Built in 1956 by Saunders-Roe (Anglesey) Ltd. (This should not be confused with HMCS Bras d'Or, a 240 tonne hydrofoil patrol vessel, which was the result of the tests performed by the R-103.)

Illuminated signs
Early in aviation, it was difficult – if not impossible – to supply uninterrupted power in aircraft. Saunders-Roe solved this problem by putting an ionising gas (tritium; 3H) in small tubes. Tritium was discovered in 1934 by Lord Rutherford. The tubes ("Betalights") are made of borosilicate glass. The inside of the tubes is coated with a fluorescent powder, which glows as a result of the ionizing radiation of the tritium gas. Such a tube emits light for 15 years. Betalights were used to illuminate the flight instruments, exit signs and corridors of the aircraft produced by Saunders-Roe. When Saunders-Roe was acquired by Westland Helicopters production continued via Saunders-Roe Developments Ltd of North Hyde Road, Hayes, Middlesex (the former Fairey Aviation Head office). Betalight production was made independent under the name SRBT (Saunders-Roe Betalight Technology). A factory was established in Pembroke, Ontario, Canada, where tritium supplies are readily available. Today betalights are used in self luminous escape-route signs, under the product name Betalux.

Mark 3 airborne lifeboat

In early 1953, Saunders-Roe at Anglesey completed the Mark 3 airborne lifeboat to be fitted underneath the Avro Shackleton maritime reconnaissance aircraft. This model was made entirely of aluminium, previous marks being made of timber. Parachuted at a rate of 20 feet per second into the rescue zone, the craft was powered by a Vincent motorcycles HRD T5 15 hp engine; sails and a fishing kit were also provided.

Road vehicles
During World War II, Saunders-Roe opened a factory at Fryars in Llanfaes, Anglesey, converting and maintaining Catalina flying boats. In the late 1940s and 1950s the Beaumaris factory began making bus bodies under the names Saunders, SEAS (Saunders Engineering & Shipbuilding) and SARO. When AEC took over Crossley Motors, many of the design staff left and joined SARO. In pre-Atlantean days when Leyland began looking at low floor vehicles, the "Low Loader" (STF 90) bodied by SARO was similar in certain respects to the Crossley chassisless bus designs. Bodies were manufactured at Beaumaris for installing on "Leyland Royal Tiger" and "Leyland Tiger Cub" chassis; SARO bodied 250 RTs for London Transport between 1948 and 1950 (RT 1152–1401), which were almost indistinguishable from the standard Weymann/Park Royal products; and some double-deck buses for Liverpool Corporation. 620 prefabricated Rivalloy (the brand name comes from rivetted (aluminium) alloy) single deck buses components for local assembly were sold to Autobuses Modernos SA, Cuba which later became Omnibus Metropolitanos, S.A. Another large customer was Auckland Regional Transport in New Zealand who took the Rivalloy body on 90 Daimler Freeline chassis. In 1948 the only double deck bodies to be exported were 20 ordered by South African operator Durban Motor Transport which were mounted on AEC Regent Mark III chassis.   
In the UK large numbers of SARO bodies were specified by the British Electric Traction group on Leyland Tiger Cub chassis, operators including Trent, East Midland, Ribble, Yorkshire Traction and the Northern General Group. An integral version of the body design powered by a Gardner 5HLW engine was bought by Maidstone & District.

The factory later passed to Cammell Laird who mainly used it for producing refuse-collection vehicles, but when Metro Cammell Weymann had a production backlog, they completed a batch of MCW-style double deck forward-entrance highbridge bodies on Leyland Titan PD3 for Brighton Corporation, these were numbered 31–5, registered LUF131-5F and delivered in June and July 1968, they were unusual as front engined half-cab buses built to be driver operated.

See also 
Aerospace industry in the United Kingdom
Goatley boat

References

Notes

Bibliography

Peter London, Saunders and Saro Aircraft Since 1917, Putnam (Conway Maritime Press), London, 1988
 The Cockleshell Canoes, Quentin Rees,  Amberley Press, 2008, reprinted 2nd edition 2009
 The Cockleshell Heroes — The Final Witness, Amberley Press, December 2010

External links

 Hovercraft of Saunders-Roe, Westlands, and BHC
 A Short History of Saunders Roe

 
Defunct aircraft manufacturers of the United Kingdom
Defunct bus manufacturers of the United Kingdom
Defunct helicopter manufacturers of the United Kingdom
Companies based on the Isle of Wight
Defunct shipbuilding companies of England